Milan Škriniar (born 11 February 1995) is a Slovak professional footballer who plays as a centre-back for  club Inter Milan and captains the Slovakia national team.

Club career

MŠK Žilina

Škriniar began his career in the youth structures of FK Žiar nad Hronom before joining the youth setup of MŠK Žilina at age 12. He made his official Slovak Super Liga debut for the first team on 27 March 2012 aged 17 years and 49 days, in a match against ViOn Zlaté Moravce. On 23 November 2012 he scored his first goal in the Slovak Super Liga against ViOn during a 4–1 victory.

Škriniar was sent on loan for half a season to ViOn Zlaté Moravce in February 2013, in order to gain more first-team experience.

Sampdoria
On 29 January 2016, Sampdoria announced the signing of Milan Škriniar on a four-and-half year contract. He made his debut in a 2–1 home victory over Lazio in late April. During the next season Škriniar played a key role for Marco Giampaolo's Blucerchiati, finishing the campaign as the youngest defender to have made at least 35 appearances in Serie A.

Inter Milan
On 7 July 2017, Škriniar completed a transfer to fellow Serie A side Inter Milan signing a five-year contract. The club paid a reported fee around €20 million and also included the striker Gianluca Caprari. The transfer made Škriniar the most expensive Slovak player of all time. He was presented four days later and received squad number 37, stating: "It's amazing to think that in 18 months I've gone from the Slovakian league to playing for a club like Inter."

Škriniar made his competitive debut for the club on 20 August in the opening matchday of 2017–18 Serie A versus Fiorentina as Inter won 3–0 at San Siro. He scored his first Serie A goal later on 16 September against Crotone, the opener in the 82nd minute with a right-footed shot in an eventual 2–0 away win to keep Inter's winning streak. His second of the campaign came in matchday 10 against his former side Sampdoria on 24 October, netting again the opener as Inter won 3–2.

Škriniar was distinguished for his performances in the first part of the season, being one of the best players of the squad. He continued with his great performances even in the second part of the season, which proved clinical for the team, which returned to UEFA Champions League after six years. He concluded the season by playing in all 38 matches in league, receiving only two yellow cards.

In the 2018–19 season, Škriniar made his debut in the UEFA Champions League on 18 September in the opening group stage match against Tottenham Hotspur, playing full-90 minutes in a 2–1 comeback win at San Siro. On 2 November 2019, in a Serie A match against Bologna which ended in a 2–1 away win, Škriniar made his 100th appearance in all competitions for Inter, all of them as starter.

On 3 November 2021, Škriniar scored his first UEFA Champions League goal in a 3–1 away win against Sheriff Tiraspol.

On 29 January 2023, Škriniar confirmed that he had signed a contract with Ligue 1 club Paris Saint-Germain to join the club on a free transfer in the summer.

International career
Škriniar represented various Slovak youth teams, and made his debut for the Slovakia senior squad in a friendly 3–1 win over Georgia on 27 May 2016. By the end of the year, he was a part of a number of different games and became a notable part of the squad in the 2018 World Cup qualification, usually playing as a defensive midfielder.

After the international retirement of Ján Ďurica in November 2017, Škriniar took his place as a centre-back partner to Martin Škrtel in the national team, even directing Slovak defence in Škrtel's absences (for example in a double fixture against Netherlands and Morocco despite his relatively young age, compared to experienced side-backs Peter Pekarík and Tomáš Hubočan).

Following the international retirement of national team captain Marek Hamšík, Škriniar was appointed the captain of the team in June 2022. National team coach Štefan Tarkovič highlighted Škriniar's leadership qualities during the announcement.

Style of play
Škriniar has been described as a defender who is "a strong tackler who is quick to make clearances". A natural centre-back, he can also be deployed as a defensive midfielder where he also produced outstanding performances with under-21 side. His former youth manager said of him: He [Škriniar] has always been the leader on and off the pitch. He has been described in the media as the successor to former Liverpool icon Martin Škrtel in Slovakia's defensive line. He has also drawn praise from several Italian pundits for his positional sense, as well as his ability in the air, and in one on one situations. When linked with a transfer to PSG in June 2022, L'Équipe highlighted Škriniar's high pass and long pass accuracy, his complexity and low injury proneness and imposing figure.

Career statistics

Club

International

Slovakia score listed first, score column indicates score after each Škriniar goal.

Honours
MŠK Žilina
Slovak Super Liga: 2011–12
Slovak Cup: 2011–12

Inter Milan
Serie A: 2020–21
Coppa Italia: 2021–22
Supercoppa Italiana: 2021, 2022
UEFA Europa League runner-up: 2019–20

Slovakia
King's Cup: 2018

Individual
Peter Dubovský Award: 2016
UEFA European Under-21 Championship Team of the Tournament: 2017
Slovak Footballer of the Year: 2019, 2020, 2021

References

External links

Profile at the Inter Milan website

1995 births
Living people
Sportspeople from Žiar nad Hronom
Slovak footballers
Slovakia youth international footballers
Slovakia under-21 international footballers
Slovakia international footballers
Association football defenders
MŠK Žilina players
FC ViOn Zlaté Moravce players
U.C. Sampdoria players
Inter Milan players
Slovak Super Liga players
Serie A players
UEFA Euro 2016 players
UEFA Euro 2020 players
Slovak expatriate footballers
Expatriate footballers in Italy
Slovak expatriate sportspeople in Italy